Doug Whitmore may refer to:

Doug Whitmore, character in 50 First Dates
Doug Whitmore (politician) in 134th Georgia General Assembly